Gold Typhoon Group is a Chinese entertainment company. Gold Label was founded in 2004 in Hong Kong, launched with the support of EMI, and acquired EMI Music Taiwan / EMI Music China (Typhoon Records) in 2008, reforming to Gold Typhoon. On 1 January 2011, it became a wholly owned subsidiary of Pacific Global Management Asia (PGMA) under the leadership of Chairman Louis Pong.

Gold Typhoon represents many Chinese and international artists, and has offices in Beijing, Shanghai, Guangzhou, Chengdu, Taipei and Hong Kong. In 2004, former Go East Entertainment CEO Paco Wong decided to not work with the parent company of Go East, Universal Group Hong Kong, but to instead work for EMI Hong Kong as they promised to launch a new label. Paco Wong was to have total control of the new label which became Gold Label Entertainment.

The company was acquired by Warner Music Group in April 2014.

History
In 2004, former Go East Entertainment CEO Paco Wong decided to not work with the parent company of Go East, Universal Group Hong Kong, but to instead work for EMI Hong Kong as they promised to launch a new label. Paco Wong was to have total control of the new label which became Gold Label Entertainment.

All products of Gold Label Entertainment share the same ISRC and bar-code system with EMI which include, "07243-", "00946-" and newly released "50999-". Gold Label under EMI has released the first DRM-free music downloading agreement with Hong Kong's local mobile brand CSL mobile. In addition to marketing and distribution, the company is also involved in artist and concert management.

EMI Music Hong Kong decided to delegate its local activities to Gold Label, leaving EMI to concentrate on international artists.  Gold Label has also taken over EMI Hong Kong's local artists roster, which includes Kary Ng, Stephy Tang, Cookies, Ping Pung, Edmond Leung. With the launch of Capitol Music Taiwan by EMI, Gold Label is now working to market Taiwanese diva Jolin Tsai in Hong Kong. The label has signed local singers Miriam Yeung and Sandy Lam. Together, with re-shaping local stars Ronald Cheng, Leo Ku and Edmond Leung, Gold Label is now one of the largest music companies in Hong Kong.

The company also promotes new artists. Justin Lo, a singer-songwriter from the United States, won all new artist's awards in Hong Kong in 2005 by having the top-10 best selling records in Hong Kong 2005.

In the circulated materials such as the Red Bus Airplay Calculation, Gold Label Entertainment is still referred as EMI.

In July 2008, EMI Group and Gold Label announced EMI would sell all its 50% stakes at Gold Label Entertainment Ltd., Push Typhoon Records and the whole EMI Music Taiwan to Typhoon Group. And Gold Label Records and Gold Label Entertainment would change its name to Gold Typhoon with branches in the Greater China region. Also, EMI would appoint Gold Typhoon as its only distributing partners in the region. Conversely, Gold Typhoon would release through EMI internationally.

On 1 January 2011, Gold Typhoon Group became a wholly owned subsidiary of Pacific Global Management.

It was acquired by Warner Music Group in April 2014.

Music
Gold Typhoon Group is the exclusive licensee of EMI's physical and digital music in China and Taiwan. Gold Typhoon also releases albums from European and American, Korean and Japanese artists. Gold Typhoon's catalogue contains more than 600,000 Chinese and international songs.  As one of the biggest record labels and artist management companies in greater China, Gold Typhoon represents more than 50 Chinese pop artists, including Taiwan artists A-Mei, Show Lo, Elva Hsiao, Lollipop F, Jing Chang; Mainland China artists Xu Wei, Li Jian, Zhang Wei, Fu Xinbo, Peiyi Yang and Hong Kong artist Ronald Cheng, Wu Jing, Edmond Leung, Rubberband, Louis Cheung and so forth.

Gold Typhoon also acts as an agent for international artists, and provides distribution and marketing in greater China for artists including Coldplay, Katy Perry, Kylie Minogue, Robbie Williams, Lady Antebellum, David Guetta, Maksim, Michael Learns To Rock; Japanese artists including Hikaru Utada, AKB48, Glay, Miyavi, Nana Mizuki; Korean idol Jang Keun-Suk, After School; and classical musicians Yundi Li, Xuefei Yang, Sarah Chang and Niu Niu.

Sponsor and brand ambassador
Gold Typhoon has partnerships with many well-known Chinese and international brands.
Gold Typhoon's business development department arranges brand ambassadorships for its artists, such as Yundi Li (Zegna), David Tao and A-Mei (Masterkong Ice Tea), Fahrenheit (Masterkong 3+2), David Tao and S.H.E (Daphne), Li Jian and Anson Hu (Nokia), Bibi Zhou (Bossini, Aoni Stereo)

Brands sponsored shows for Gold Typhoon Artists include: Show Lo's live performance in Hong Kong sponsored by SaSa, Pepsi Coke and Fortress; Chow Tai Fook Jewellery sponsored Stephy Tang's concert; Rubberband received supports from Samsung and Volkswagen sponsored Big Four’s tour.

Other business partners include Hutchison Telecom Hong Kong, Chivas, Chung Yuen Hong Kong, Shiseido, Levis, EPS, Giorano and so forth.

Artist Management
Gold Label was started as a small artist management agency. Paco Wong was named the "Golden Agent" in Hong Kong as he helped many once unsuccessful artists build up their careers, including Jacky Cheung, Andy Lau, Aaron Kwok, Sammi Cheng, Miriam Yeung, Sally Yeh, Sandy Lam, and Leo Ku. Generally speaking, rosters from Gold Label Management are signed to its music department when artists start their singing career. Before EMI Music Hong Kong delegated local artist activities to Gold Label Entertainment, Gold Label Management was already home of EMI's rosters, including Edmond Leung and The Cookies.

Now Gold Typhoon Group is the artist manager of many artists like Xu Wei, Li Jian in Mainland, Lollipop F in Taiwan, Terry Zou, AOA and other artists in Hong Kong. Gold Typhoon also shared the rights to manage other artists like A-mei, Elva Hsiao, Show Lo etc.

Concert production
In 2004, Gold Label began concert production. The first concert produced was Miriam Yeung's KungHiFatChoi Concert Vol. 3 in February 2004 in association with East Asia Entertainment, Abbas Entertainment Hong Kong and Yiu Wing Entertainment. After gaining experience through independent concerts, they are now producing for their own rosters by outsourcing to other entertainment firms and production houses. Other concert productions include Edmond Leung's I love Kitchen Concert, Jolin Tsai's Dancing Forever World Tour in Hong Kong, Leo Ku's Magic Moments Live 2007, Stephy Tang's See Thru Concert 2007 and Kary Ng's Lady K Concert 2008.

Gold Typhoon has an experienced live performance production team, and has held and helped arrange successful performances in recent years, for artists including David Tao, Show Lo, A-Mei, Elva Hsiao, Bibi Zhou, Yundi, Xu Wei, Li Jian, Ronald Cheng, The Flowers/Zhang Wei, Rubberband, Michael Learns To Rock, Maksim, and Niu Niu.

Artist rosters

Hong Kong
Abella Leung (梁佑嘉) (singer)
AOA (singer)
goldEN (singer/songwriter)
Kay Tse (謝安琪) (singer)
Khalil Fong (方大同)(singer/songwriter)
Louis Cheung (張繼聰) (singer)
Nick Ngai (倪力)(singer/songwriter)
Terry Zou (鄒文正) (singer)

Mainland China
Ethan Liang (梁閎) (DJ/singer/songwriter)
GT Star
Han Xue (韓雪)
Hu Ge (胡歌)
Jeff Kung (孔令奇)
Qin Lan (秦嵐)
Wu Jing (吳京) (actor)
Yang Peiyi (楊沛宜)

Philippines
Charlie Green (查理格林)

Taiwan

Johnny Chen (陳煥昌 / 小蟲)
Lollipop F (formerly Lollipop 棒棒堂) - renamed in October 2010
OD (歐漢聲)
Shinlung (辛龍)
Yan Fan (陽帆)
Yang Siou-Huei (楊繡惠)

South Korea
After School (band)
IU (singer)
Orange caramel (After School Sub Unit)
Son Dam-bi

Singapore
Derrick Hoh (何維健)

Japan
AKB48
Atsuko Maeda
Eri Kitamura
Glay
Inori Minase
Kana Uemura
Kreva (rapper)
Mamoru Miyano
Miyavi
Momoiro Clover Z
Nana Mizuki
Shouta Aoi
Taro Hakase
Tokyo Jihen
Yo Hitoto
Yukie Nishimura

International artists
Evanescence

Classical artists
Niu Niu (牛牛)
Yang Xuefei (楊雪霏)
陳軍

Previous artists
Alex Fong (方力申) (singer/actor) (2000-2011)
Alex Lee (李崗霖)(Virgin Music Taiwan)
Awaking Band (元衛覺醒) (Capitol Music Taiwan) (2007–2008)
Big Four (pop group)
Celina Jade (Actress/singer)
Chelsea Tong (唐素琪) (actress) (2007-2009)
Cookies (singing group, disbanded)
Cyndi Wang (王心凌）now in Universal
A-mei (張惠妹) now in EMI/Universal
Julia Peng (彭佳慧) now in Sony Music
Feng Fei-fei (鳳飛飛) (Died on January 3, 2012)
I Love U Boy'z (CRHK DJ/TV personality) (signed in Jan, 2009)
Jan Lamb (林海峰) (singer/actor/CRHK DJ)
Jolin Tsai (蔡依林) (Capitol Music Taiwan) (2005–2008)
Justin Lo (側田) (singer/actor/songwriter) (2005-2010)
Kary Ng (吳雨霏) (singer/actress) (2002-2011)
Khloe Chu (朱紫嬈) (singer)
Leo Ku (古巨基) (singer/actor) (2003–2009)
Miki Yeung (楊愛瑾) (singer/actress)
Miriam Yeung (楊千嬅) (singer/actress) (2003–2006)
Nicholas Teo (張棟樑) (Virgin Music Taiwan) (2005–2008)
Penny Dai (戴佩妮)(EMI Music Taiwan)
Ping Pung (punk and pop rock group)
Richie Ren (任賢齊) (EMI Music Taiwan) (2005–2008)
Sammy Leung (森美) (CRHK DJ/TVB artist)
Sandy Lam (林憶蓮) (singer)
Seven (YG Entertainment Korea)
SoftHard (pop group)
Stanley Huang (黃立行) (Capitol Music Taiwan) (2006–2008)
Stefanie Sun (孫燕姿)
Stephy Tang (鄧麗欣) (singer/actress/author) (2002-2011)
Theresa Fu (傅穎)
William So (蘇永康)

EMI Catalogue
Thirty Seconds to Mars 30秒上火星
Lenny Kravitz 藍尼克羅維茲
 A Fine Frenzy 美麗瞬間
Leon Jay Williams 立威廉
A Place To Bury Strangers 亂葬崗樂團
Leon Russell 里昂羅素
A.K. A.K. (Atomic Kitten)	
Les Petits Chanteurs De Saint 聖馬克教堂兒童合唱團
About Group 關於我們
LeToya 樂朵雅
Adam Faith 亞當費斯
Levon Helm 李翁赫姆
Adam Tensta 亞當坦斯達	 
Liars 騙徒樂團
Adem 亞當樂團
Lightships 燈船樂團
Adrian Sherwood 亞卓安雪伍
Lightspeed Champion 光速玩家
Air 空氣	 
 里菈當斯 *Lila Downs
 飛航管制樂團 *Air Traffic	
 莉莉艾倫 *Lily Allen
 艾爾史都華 *Al Stewart
 林迪斯芳樂團 *Lindisfarne
 艾倫蘇松*Alain Souchon	
 流動液態合唱團*Liquid Liquid
 亞倫班奈，彼得庫克，喬納森米勒和杜德利摩爾 Alan Bennett, Peter Cook, Jona	
 調皮賈姬 Little Jackie
 呼叫樂團之艾利克斯 Alex Band	
 臨場感樂團 Live
 北極潑猴之艾力克斯 Alex Turner
 麗茲費兒 Liz Phair
 亞歷山大 Alexander Pries	
 麗莎曼妮 Liza Manili
 艾爾菲樂團 ALFIE
 麗莎明妮莉 Liza Minnelli
 愛麗絲 Alice	
 蘿恩 Loane
 束縛艾利斯 Alice In Chains	
 親親隆尼 Loney, Dear
 聖女合唱團 All Saints	
 灰狼一族合唱團 Los Lobos
 合而為一 ALL-4-ONE	
 陸巴洛 Lou Barlow
 幻化結構樂團 Alter Bridge	
 路易斯普萊瑪 Louis Prima
 阿莉和阿J Aly&AJ	* 愛是唯一樂團 Love Is All
 雌雄同體 AMORPHOUS ANDROGYNOUS	
 愛戀樂團 Lovex
 安柏林樂團 ANBERLIN	
 菁英份子 LOW MILLIONS
 安迪貝爾 Andy Bell	
 露仙妮鮑耶 Lucienne Boyer
 安琪哈特 Angie Hart	
 露西妮黛伊樂 Lucienne Delyle
 動物共同體樂團 Animal Collective	
 路克布萊恩 Luke Bryan
 恩雅亞柏瑞克 ANJA GARBAREK	
 茹絲卡薩爾 Luz Casal
 安娜卡維 Anna Calvi	
 小麥：麥特波柯拉 M. Pokora
 安妮克拉克 Anne Clark	
 天生玩家樂團 M.V.P.
 安瑪莉 Anne Murray	
 M83
 世外桃源 Arcadia	
 馬卡寇樂團 Macaco
 阿奇布朗森軍團 Archie Bronson Outfit	
 K小姐 Mademoiselle K
 北極潑猴 Arctic Monkeys
 瘋子樂團 Madness
 阿里斯蒂德布里昂 Aristide Bruant	
 聖母合唱團 MADREDEUS
 阿諾 Arno	
 麥佐迦達樂團 Madrugada
 澀藝術樂團 ART BRUT	
 雜誌樂團 Magazine
 亞洲音效轉錄機構 ASIAN DUB FOUNDATION	
 神力系統 Magic System
 運動失調症（嗆辣紅椒之約翰伏許安） Ataxia	
 天使 Malachai
 體育健將樂團 Athlete	
 曼朵戴歐樂團 Mando Diao
 光明女神 Austra	
 黑手黨 Mano Negra
 阿凡 Avant	
 曼森 Mansun
 紅色艾希爾 Axelle Red	
 面孔 Maps
 步履蹣跚樂團 Babyshambles	
 馬克安東 Marc Antoin
 塗鴉男孩 Badly Drawn Boy	
 馬克穆林 Marc Moulin
 巴哈人 Baha Men	
 瑪西遊樂園 Marcy Playground
 巴特摩拉 Baltimora
 瑪莉笛比 Marie Digby
 BJH樂團 Barclay James Harvest	
 海獅合唱團 Marillion
 裸體淑女 Barenaked Ladies	
 瑪麗莎蒙特 Marisa Monte
 貝瑞亞當森 Barry Adamson	
 「窈窕美眉」瑪莉特 Marit Larsen
 棒棒仙女 Bat For Lashes	
 瑪麗莎 Mariza
 巴克斯特狄爾瑞 Baxter Dury	
 馬可休斯頓 Marques Houston
 BBC無線電音樂工場 BBC Radiophonic Workshop	
 馬蒂史都華 Marty Stuart
 華麗爵士樂團 BE Bop Deluxe	
 瑪麗霍普金斯 Mary Hopkin
 野獸男孩 Beastie Boys	
 強烈衝擊 Massive Attack
 貝貝 Bebe	
 黑幫教父P Master P
 陛尼曼 Beenie Man
	* 馬地雅巴沙樂團 Matia Bazar
 貝琳達 Belinda	
 麥特蒙洛 Matt Monro
 貝琳達卡萊兒 Belinda Carlisle	
 麥特納森 Matt Nathanson
 班哈伯 Ben Harper	
 萬事OK樂團 MATTAFIX
 班哈伯與絕情樂團 Ben Harper And Relentless 7	
 馬提亞斯海恩 Matthias Reim
 班哈伯與天真罪犯樂團 Ben Harper And The Innocent Cr	
 馬堤亞多納 Mattia Donna
 班哲明弼歐雷 Benjamin Biolay	
 墨利斯雪佛萊 Maurice Chevalier
 賓居費瑞 Benjy Ferree	
 麥克斯波艾斯 Max Boyce
 弼尼曼 BENNIE MAN	
 冰封凍原 Max Tundra
 伯特詹茨 Bert Jansch	
 麥斯米蘭 Maximilian Hecker
 貝詩歐頓 Beth Orton	
 迷宮樂團與法藍基比佛利 Maze Featuring Frankie Beverly
 碧薇莉奈特 Beverley Knight	
 有志一同 Me And My Army
 大人物 BIG BOI	
 肉塊 Meat Loaf
 珊瑚樂團之比爾瓊斯 Bill Ryder-Jones	
 麥加帝斯 Megadeth
 比利艾鐸 Billy Idol
 媚兒喜 Mel C
 比利普瑞斯登 Billy Preston	
 梅格海洛 Merle Haggard
 比利史奎爾 Billy Squier	
 麥可法藍堤與先鋒樂團 Michael Franti & Spearhead
 黑色骰子樂團 Black Dice	
 搖滾麥克 Michael Learns To Rock
 黑色草原 Black Prairie	
 麥可尼曼 Michael Nyman
 黑色安息日 Black Sabbath
 米克哈維 MICK HARVEY
 白色樂團 BLANC	
 三維麥基 Mickey 3D
 瞽目守護神樂團 Blind Guardian	
 米茲尤瑞 Midge Ure
 金髮美女合唱團 Blondie	
 午夜巨神 Midnight Juggernauts
 血橙 Blood Orange	
 邁可布蘭特 Mike Brant
 BLUE	
 救世主 MIMS
 布勒合唱團 Blur	
 米娜 Mina
 巴布席格與銀彈合唱團 Bob Seger & The Silver Bullet	
 明蒂史密斯 Mindy Smith
 鮑比維 Bobby Vee	
 小貓小姐 MISS KITTEN
 空殼樂團 BODIES WITHOUT ORGANS (BWO)	
 蜜絲婷瑰 Mistinguett
 小兔子王子比利 Bonnie 'Prince' Billy	
 魔比 Moby
 邦妮芮特 BONNIE RAITT
 蒙提卡查察 Monte Cazazza
 柏拉許樂團 Bratsch	
 晨跑樂團 Morning Parade
 布朗德雷諾斯樂團 Braund Reynolds	
 晨跑健將樂團 Morning Runner
 瘋狂班哲明樂團 Breaking Benjamin	
 晨木樂團 Morningwood
 BREAKS合作社 BREAKS CO-OP	
 莫里西 Morrissey
 布萊恩伊諾 Brian Eno	
 原動力樂團 Motor
 布萊恩威爾森 Brian Wilson	
 泡泡T. DJ Mousse T. vs The Dandy Warhols
 B.E.F. British Electric Foundation	
 M M
 布魯斯福賽斯 Bruce Forsyth	
 永生樂團 N.E.R.D.
 布魯諾寇萊 BRUNO COULAIS	
 N.W.A
 布萊恩費瑞 Bryan Ferry
 納京高 Nat King Cole
 疤 霸 Bubba Sparxxx	
 尼克13 Nick 13
 吵鬧公雞樂團 Buzzcocks	
 尼克凱夫與壞種子樂團 Nick Cave & The Bad Seeds
 C級謀殺 C-Murder	
 尼克凱夫與華倫艾利斯 Nick Cave & Warren Ellis
 C21	
 核心塵土樂隊 Nitty Gritty Dirt Band
 伏爾泰小酒館 Cabaret Voltaire	
 北方孤星 Novastar
 凱撒大帝 CAESARS	
 Ok Go
 卡力 Cali	
 奧莉薇亞紐頓強 Olivia Newton-John
 卡蜜兒 Camille	
 歐瑪瑞 Omarion
 罐頭樂團 Can	
 黑夜行列合唱團OMD Orchestral Manoeuvres In The D
 坎蒂絲妲頓 Candi Staton	
 聖堂豪傑 ORISHAS
 領隊樂團 Captain	
 熊 Ours
 卡爾諾倫 Carl Norén	
 歐文帕雷特 Owen Pallett
 北方車庫樂團 CARPARK NORTH	
 保羅艾波朗 Pablo Alborán
 凱斯馬克歐斯 Cass McCombs	
 佩特班納塔 Pat Benatar
 卡休斯樂團 Cassius	
 派特格林 Pat Green
 查爾阿茲納弗 Charles Aznavour	
 保羅安卡 Paul Anka
 夏勒川諾 Charles Trenet	
 保羅麥卡尼 Paul McCartney
 小查理 Charlie Green	
 保羅歐肯弗德 PAUL OAKENFOLD
 貓兒 Chat	
 寶拉阿巴杜 Paula Abdul
 恰布曼弭 Cheb Mami	
 寶琳 Pauline
 恰布曼 Cheb Mami	
 亮點樂團 Peaking Lights
 雪莉萊特 Chely Wright	
 企鵝咖啡館 Penguin Cafe Orchestra
 珍愛天女合唱團 Cherish	
 羅克賽之皮爾蓋斯雷 Per Gessle
 屎蛋幫 Chiddy Bang	
 寵物店男孩 Pet Shop Boys
 首領樂團 Chief	
 彼得道堤 Peter Doherty
 慶鷹 Chingy	
 彼得蓋布瑞爾 Peter Gabriel
 克里斯汀史瓦力耶 Christian Chevallier	
 佩特菈 尚 菲莉普森 Petra Jean Phillipson
 綺拉布蕾克 Cilla Black	
 街頭時尚教皇 菲董 PHARRELL WILLIAMS
 曙光樂團 Civil Twilight	
 鳳凰樂團 Phoenix
 克萊兒納穆爾 Claire Denamur	
 平克佛洛伊德 Pink Floyd
 克里夫李察 Cliff Richard
 小木偶 Pinocchio
 克里夫李察和影子樂團 Cliff Richard & The Shadows	
 百憂解 Placebo
 診療室樂團 Clinic	
 就是白樂團 Plain White T's
 拒當倫敦佬樂團 Cockney Rejects	
 毒藥合唱團 Poison
 酷玩樂團 Coldplay
 保拉 Polar
 魔法術 CONJURE ONE	
 波莉 Polly Scattergood
 柯賓布魯 Corbin Bleu	
 搖滾起始 Prime Circle
 肯妮貝兒 Corinne Bailey Rae	
 普莉西雅 Priscilla Ahn
 就是這樣樂團 Correcto	
 格林老師 Professor Green
 寇特妮洛芙 Courtney Love	
 Psapp
 主義合唱團 Creed	
 公共形象 Public Image Ltd (P.I.L.)
 罪惡與城市之道 Crime And The City Solution	
 石器時代女王 Queens Of The Stone Age
 擠屋合唱團 Crowded House	
 德國女皇合唱團 Queensryche
 文化俱樂部合唱團 Culture Club	
 R.E.M.
 墓園三人組 Cypress Hill	
 電台四號樂團 RADIO 4
 德美友誼社 D.A.F.	
 電台司令 Radiohead
 傻瓜龐克 Daft Punk	
 雷蒙斯合唱團 Ramones
 鼠尾老大與丹尼爾盧皮 Danger Mouse & Daniele Luppi
 拉斐爾 Raphael
 鼠尾老大與天馬樂團 Danger Mouse & Sparklehorse	
 拉菲爾 Raphael (Spain)
 達瑞歐基 Dario G	
 雷可福磊斯合唱團 Rascal Flatts
 戴利斯路克 Darius Rucker	
 雷查爾斯 Ray Charles
 空氣之達克爾 Darkel	
 雷旺圖拉 Ray Ventura
 戴夫高瀚 Dave Gahan	
 地產樂團 Real Estate
 大衛鮑伊 David Bowie	
 報應樂團 Recoil
 大衛庫塔 David Guetta	
 嗆辣紅椒合唱團 Red Hot Chili Peppers
 大衛席維安 David Sylvian	
 雷恩哈德梅 Reinhard Mey
 大衛華特 DAVID WALTERS	
 K勢力樂團 RELIENT K
 戴斯 Daz	
 雷諾德 Renaud
 鼠來寶 Deadmau5	
 復古左輪 Revolver
 狄恩馬汀 Dean Martin	
 李察艾希克羅 RICHARD ASHCROFT
 深紫色合唱團 Deep Purple
 李察哈里 Richard Hawley
 黛莉雅與蓋文 Delia Gonzalez & gavin Russom	
 理察瑪爾克斯 Richard Marx
 DFB DEM FRANCHIZE BOYZ	
 希娜凱蒂 Rina Ketty
 流行尖端 Depeche Mode	
 聳立樂團 Rise To Remain
 浪跡天涯 Deportees	
 羅比威廉斯 Robbie Williams
 德瑞克和克萊夫 Derek & Clive	
 羅勃帕瑪 Robert Palmer
 狄克西午夜狂奔者 Dexy's Midnight Runners	
 羅伯藍道夫與家族樂團 Robert Randolph And The Family
 璀鑽 Diam's	
 羅賓特羅爾 Robin Trower
 戴蒙妲葛拉絲 Diamanda Galas	
 羅夫 Rohff
 戴安娜羅絲 Diana Ross	
 Moloko之蘿西墨菲 Roisin Murphy
 黛安柏奇 Diane Birch	
 放肆翻滾樂團 Roll Deep
 狄耶克斯班特利 Dierks Bentley	
 荷曼瑟達 Romane Serda
 靡幻主義 DIGITALISM	
 羅珊凱許 Rosanne Cash
 廣大群眾樂團 Dilated People	
 蘿西 Rose
 迪奧高 Diogo Nogueira	
 羅克賽 Roxette
 骯髒計畫 Dirty Projectors	
 羅西音樂 Roxy Music
 骯髒計畫與碧玉 Dirty Projectors & Björk
 皇家愛樂管弦樂團 Royal Philharmonic Orchestra
 朵絲蕾娜 Dolcenera	
 洛伊薩普樂團 Röyksopp
 多明尼克天字號 Dominique A	
 羅伊沃德樂團 Royworld
 桃樂絲特洛伊 Doris Troy	
 李察艾希克羅與音樂聯合國 RPA And The United Nations Of
 多佛樂團 Dover	
 Runrig
 鴿子樂團 Doves	
 莎賓娜 Sabrina Starke
 開心醫生合唱團 Dr. Feelgood	
 聖靈 Sacred Spirit
 虎克博士 Dr. Hook	
 杉德凡朵 Sander Van Doorn
 約翰博士 Dr. John	
 珊蒂蕭 SANDIE SHAW
 湯姆博士 Dr. Tom	
 珊卓拉 Sandra
 恐怖地帶 Dreadzone	
 桑德琳 Sandrine Kiberlain
 BLUE 之 唐肯 Duncan James	
 小心樂團 Saosin
 杜蘭杜蘭合唱團 Duran Duran	
 薩克森合唱團 Saxon
 狄安吉羅 D’Angelo
 史考特史戴普 Scott Stapp
 厄莎姬特 Eartha Kitt	
 官樣文章 Scritti Politti
 Eazy-E	
 西巴豆樂團 Sebadoh
 艾德哈寇 ED HARCOURT	
 騷動者樂團 Seether
 艾迪柯克蘭 Eddie Cochran
 席琳娜 Selena
 艾德布勞頓樂團 Edgar Broughton Band	
 千年樂團 Sennen
 橙橘之夢之愛德嘉佛洛斯 Edgar Froese	
 賽斯 Seth Gueko
 伊迪絲琵雅芙 Edith Piaf	
 塞斯雷克曼 Seth Lakeman
 艾格 E.g.	
 性手槍樂團 Sex Pistols
 電光合唱團 Electric Light Orchestra (ELO)	
 變形雙俠 Shapeshifters
 送報童里德 Eli 'Paperboy' Reed	
 夏恩穆林斯 Shawn Mullins
 艾蓮艾莉亞 Eliane Elias	
 她和他樂團 She & Him
 伊莉莎 Eliza Doolittle	
 狂嘯嘶吼樂團 SHOUT OUT LOUDS
 艾略特史密斯 Elliott Smith	
 希雅 SIA
 殷洛伊樂團 Eloy	
 生病狗狗樂團 Sick Puppies
 貓王 Elvis Presley	
 BLUE 之 賽門韋伯 Simon Webbe
 艾蜜莉珊黛 Emeli Sandé	
 西蒙懷特 Simone White
 艾蜜莉 Emily Osment	
 頭腦簡單合唱團 Simple Minds
 艾明 Emin	
 就是紅合唱團 Simply Red
 太陽帝國 Empire Of The Sun	
 辛妮歐康諾 Sinead O'connor
 時尚終結者 END OF FASHION	
 搖滾小魔女 Skye Skye
 謎 Enigma	
 嗜睡布朗 Sleepy Brown
 顏尼歐莫里克奈 Ennio Morricone	
 史林惠特曼 Slim Whitman
 EPMD	
 潑婦樂團 Slut
 滅跡合唱團 Erasure	
 非凡人物樂團 Smashing Pumpkins
 艾瑞克裘奇 Eric Church	
 史努比狗狗 Snoop Dogg
 艾瑞克普茲 Eric Prydz	
 蘇菲 O SOFFY O
 伊天達荷 Etienne Daho	
 山卓勒許與對峙3人組 SONDRE LERCHE & THE FACES DOWN
 伊天哲也 Etienne Jaumet	
 兒子女兒樂團 Sons & Daughters
 尤金麥基尼斯 Eugene McGuinness	
 薩普落 Soprano
 伊凡塞斯 Evanescence	
 靈魂復仇者 Soul Avengerz
 青春無敵合唱團 Everlife	
 史班杜芭蕾 Spandau Ballet
 只要女孩合唱團 Everything But The Girl
 天馬樂團 Sparklehorse
 費絲伊凡 FAITH EVANS	
 斯巴達樂團 SPARTA
 法爾可 Falco	
 極速樂團 Speedway
 肥仔喬 Fat Joe	
 辣妹合唱團 Spice Girls
 浮士德 Faust	
 形而上合唱團 Spiritualized
 芬黎樂團 Finley	
 幸福甜檸檬Stacie Stacie Orrico
 軟腳蝦樂團 FLABBY	
 星航樂團 Starsailor
 偉恩的噴泉樂團 FOUNTAINS OF WAYNE	
 鋼眼視線樂團 Steeleye Span
 法蘭克波賽爾 Franck Pourcel	
 史黛拉 Stella Mwangi
 馮絲華哈蒂 Francoise Hardy	
 立體音箱樂團 STERIOGRAM
 法蘭克辛納屈 Frank Sinatra	
 史提夫曼森 Steve Mason
 法蘭基米勒 Frankie Miller
 史提夫曼森和丹尼斯波沃爾 Steve Mason & Dennis Bovell
 皇后合唱團之佛萊迪墨裘瑞 FREDDIE MERCURY	
 史提查普曼 Steven Curtis Chapman
 自由能量樂團 Free Energy	
 史都華麥克 Stewart Mac
 歡樂三男組 Fun Boy Three	
 次音速樂團 Subsonica
 芙莉雅樂團 FURIA	
 超級幼苗 Supergrass
 銀河五百樂團 Galaxie 500	
 蘇珊薇格 SUZANNE VEGA
 黑幫英雄 Gang Starr	
 蘇西奎特蘿 Suzi Quatro
 蓋瑞摩爾 Gary Moore	
 瑞典浩室黑手黨 Swedish House Mafia
 X 世代樂團 Generation X
 席德波瑞特 Syd Barrett
 創世紀合唱團 Genesis	
 說話藝術合唱團 Talk Talk
 溫柔的巨人樂團 Gentle Giant	
 臉部特寫合唱團 Talking Heads
 喬治登尼爾斯 Georg Wadenius	
 橙橘之夢 Tangerine Dream
 喬治芬頓與BBC交響樂團 George Fenton With The BBC Orc	* 駕馭浩室樂團 Teamster
 喬治哈里森 George Harrison	
 泰迪湯普森 Teddy Thompson
 喬治索羅古德 George Thorogood	
 青少年俱樂部合唱團與傑德菲爾 Teenage Fanclub & Jad Fair
 喬治索羅古德與摧毀者合唱團 George Thorogood & The Destroy	
 電氣拍普樂團 TELEPOPMUSIK
 喬治蓋塔理 Georges Guetary	
 電報機樂團 Telex
 喬治裘邦 Georges Jouvin	
 十年後合唱團 Ten Years After
 葛瑞拉菲提 Gerry Rafferty
 聖母合唱團泰瑞莎與巴西音樂大師 TERESA SALGUEIRO & SEPTETO DE
 吉柏貝考 Gilbert Becaud	
 情色幻眼樂團 THE 69 EYES
 葛倫坎坡 Glen Campbell	
 異形樂團 THE ALIENS
 冰金樂團 Goldfrapp	
 叛客魔咒之全能好手樂團 THE ALMOST
 高梅茲 GOMEZ	
 諾亞方舟樂團 The Ark
 狂野夏洛特 Good Charlotte	
 樂隊合唱團 The Band
 街頭霸王 Gorillaz	
 英國皇家御林軍連隊軍樂隊 The Band Of The Grenadier Guar
 葛拉罕卡克森 Graham Coxon	
 海灘男孩合唱團 The Beach Boys
 格蘭費雪 Gran Bel Fisher
 披頭四 The Beatles
 格蘭大道 Grand Avenue	
 小蜜蜂合唱團 THE BEES
 大放克鐵道合唱團 Grand Funk Railroad	
 貝塔樂團 The Beta Band
 大白鯊合唱團 Great White
 小鳥與蜜蜂 The Bird And The Bee
 葛瑞格拉斯威爾 Greg Laswell	
 藍色飛機樂團 The Blue Aeroplanes
 尼克凱夫之齧齒人樂團 Grinderman	
 傻瓜狗狗樂團 The Bonzo Dog Band
 蓋麥紐基恩 Guy Manoukian	
 化學兄弟 The Chemical Brothers
 荷黛絲 Hadise	
 花栗鼠三重唱 The Chipmunks
 鷹族雄風樂團 Hawkwind	
 孔固力樂團 THE CONCRETES
 海瑟海德利 Heather Hedley	
 伯爵和辛登 The Count And Sinden
 天堂17樂團 Heaven 17	
 丹地沃荷 The Dandy Warhols
 海倫夏佩羅 Helen Shapiro	
 壓軸樂團 The Decemberists
 費莎 Helene Fischer	
 神聖喜劇 THE DIVINE COMEDY
 亨利薩爾瓦多 Henri Salvador	
 墮落樂團 The Fall
 沈默英雄樂團 Heroes Del Silencio	
 菲里斯合唱團 The Feelies
 公路狂徒 Highwaymen	
 芬氏兄弟 THE FINN BROTHERS
 希拉蕊 Hilary Duff	
 加油合唱團 The Go-Go's
 好奇樂團 Hockey	
 善性樂團 The Good Natured
 勁辣薯片 Hot Chip	
 The Good,The Bad & The Queen
 熱巧克力 Hot Chocolate	
 赫里斯合唱團 The Hollies
 霍華德卡本達 Howard Carpendale	
 日本明星夢工廠 The Japanese Popstars
 人類聯盟合唱團 Human League	
 殺手樂團 The Kills
 亨佛萊利托頓樂團 Humphrey Lyttelton & His Band	
 傻瓜樂團 The Kooks
 來自巴塞隆納 I'm From Barcelona	
 末代皮影樂團 The Last Shadow Puppets
 伊恩安德森 Ian Anderson	
 小東西樂團 THE LITTLE ONES
 冰塊 Ice Cube	
 小鳥與蜜蜂之小鳥三重唱 The Living Sisters
 荒野樂團 Idlewild	
 磁場樂團 The Magnetic Fields
 伊吉帕普 Iggy Pop	
 麥可旋克 The Michael Schenker Group
 伊瑪 Imam Baildi	
 樂音樂團 The Music
 Indigo藍 Indigo	
 暢快樂團 The Nice
 藍色少女合唱團 Indigo Girls	
 恐慌計畫 The Panic Channel
 神奇魔毯合唱團 Inspiral Carpets	
 粉蠟筆與網球外套樂團 The Pastels / Tenniscoats
 國際刑警樂團 INTERPOL
 普羅克萊門兄弟 The Proclaimers
 鐵娘子樂團 Iron Maiden	
 失常樂團 The Quireboys
 伊凡諾佛薩地 Ivano Fossati	
 羅達黑天教寺 The Radha Krsna Temple
 J. Holiday	
 鼠黨 The Rat Pack
 傑克羅馬克思 Jackie Lomax	
 紅衫軍樂團 The Red Jumpsuit Apparatus
 雅克伊熱蘭 Jacques Higelin	
 勞伯克雷樂團 The Robert Cray Band
 潔米莉雅 Jamelia	
 滾石合唱團 The Rolling Stone
 詹姆斯泰勒 James Taylor	
 聖徒樂團 The Saints
 詹姆斯約克 James Yorkston	
 逐夢者合唱團 The Seekers
 詹姆斯約克與大眼睛樂團 James Yorkston & The Big Eyes Family Players	
 The Source與坎蒂絲妲頓 The Source Feat Candi Staton
 怪咖傑米 Jamie T	
 特別人物合唱團 The Specials
 珍寶金 Jane Birkin
 史賓托樂團 THE SPINTO BAND
 珍的耽溺合唱團 Jane's Addiction	
 羅比威廉斯與鐵衛部隊 The Squad
 珍娜傑克森 Janet Jackson	
 行刑者合唱團 The Stranglers
 傑諾歐森 JANOVE OTTESEN	
 顫動樂團 The Thrills
 日本合唱團 Japan	
 神韻合唱團 The Verve
 傑杰強森 Jay-Jay Johanson
 番仔樂團 The Vines
 德國新爵士樂隊 Jazzanova	
 水男孩合唱團 The Waterboys
 尚沙伯龍 Jean Sablon	
 華生雙姝 The Watson Twins
 尚路易歐貝 Jean-Louis Aubert	
 小鬼當家樂團 These Kids Wear Crowns
 尚路易穆哈 Jean-Louis Murat	
 新教徒樂團 These New Puritans
 吉妮奧蒂嘉 Jeannie Ortega	
 湯瑪斯道比 Thomas Dolby
 JD JERMAINE DUPRI	
 悸動軟骨 Throbbing Gristle
 傑洛米范登豪 Jerome Van Den Hole	
 雷霆樂團 Thunder
 傑西庫克 Jesse Cook	
 蒂娜亞瑞娜 Tina Arena
 傑西麥卡尼 Jesse McCartney	
 蒂娜透娜 Tina Turner
 噴射機合唱團 Jet	
 天霸泰尼 Tinie Tempah
 傑叟羅圖樂團 Jethro Tull	
 小人物大英雄樂團 Tiny Masters Of Today
 金布里克曼 JIM BRICKMAN	
 提杰安若費洛 Tiziano Ferro
 神氣活現的兔子 Jive Bunny	
 造反樂團 To Kill A King
 喬庫克 Joe Cooker	
 頹廢洛可可樂團 To Rococo Rot
 喬伊蒙大拿 Joey Montana	
 湯姆瓊斯 Tom Jones
 約翰貝瑞 John Barry	
 湯尼艾倫 Tony Allen
 約翰凱爾 John Cale
 湯尼馮查德 Townes Van Zandt
 嗆辣紅椒之約翰伏許安 John Frusciante	
 崔斯艾金斯 Trace Adkins
 約翰藍儂 John Lennon	
 崔西索恩 Tracey Thorn
 約翰塔弗納 John Tavener	
 崔西垃圾拖車樂團 Trailer Trash Tracys
 強尼克雷格 Johnny Clegg	
 詭計合唱團 Tricky
 強尼溫特 JOHNNY WINTER	
 詭計合唱團與南方好傢伙 Tricky Meets South Rakkas Crew
 鬼靈精 Joker's Daughter	
 崔絲坦 Tristan Prettyman
 強霍普金斯 Jon Hopkins	
 搞怪安德魯 Trouble Andrew
 強納斯兄弟 JONAS BROTHERS	
 TRU
 席格若斯之雍希 Jonsi	
 修車電工 TURNER
 席格若斯之雍希＋艾力克 Jonsi & Alex	
 崔姬 Twiggy
 喬丹波特 Jordan Pruitt	
 孿生姊妹樂團 Twin Sister
 喬瑟芬貝克 Josephine Baker	
 UB40
 約書亞凱迪森 JOSHUA KADISON	
 幽浮合唱團 UFO
 喬絲史東 Joss Stone	
 超音波樂團 Ultravox
 璜路易斯蓋德拉 Juan Luis Guerra	
 叛客魔咒樂團 Underoath
 茱莉‧倫敦 Julie London	
 V.E
 朱利安克雷 Julien Clerc	
 瓦萊里奧 Valerio Scanu
 小伙子樂團 Junior Boys	
 梵杭特 VAN HUNT
 賈斯汀諾魯卡 Justin Nozuka	
 范莫里森 Van Morrison
 K-OS	
 薇妮 Vanessa Hudgens
 卡加咕咕合唱團和利瑪 Kajagoogoo & Limahl	
 陳美 VANESSA-MAE
 凱西黔柏絲 Kasey Chambers	
 媧庭娜女歌隊 Varttina
 凱特布希 Kate Bush	
 瓦斯科羅西 Vasco Rossi
 凱特萊恩 Kate Ryan	
 薇拉琳恩 Vera Lynn
 凱西與陽光合唱團 KC & The Sunshine Band	
 VHS或BETA VHS OR BETA
 齊斯艾本 Keith Urban	
 村民樂團 Villagers
 酷莉絲 Kelis	
 溫尼 Vinnie Who
 肯尼羅傑斯 Kenny Rogers	
 退色狀態 Washed Out
 凱倫安 Keren Ann	
 臨界點樂團 Watershed
 凱文艾爾斯 Kevin Ayers	
 自然科學家樂團 We Are Scientists
 琪琪蒂 Kiki Dee	
 聖徒當機樂團 When Saints Go Machine
 金卡恩絲 Kim Carnes	
 破壞狂樂團 Whirlwind Heat
 金懷德 Kim Wilde	
 小白兔樂團 White Rabbits
 特大號加農炮樂團 King Cannons	
 白蛇合唱團 Whitesnake
 雜酚王道 King Creosote	
 瘋狂野獸合唱團 Wild Beasts
 雜酚王道與強霍普金斯 King Creosote & Jon Hopkins	
 威利尼爾森 Willie Nelson
 好自在樂團 Kings Of Convenience	
 威利曼森 WILLY MASON
 克里 Kleerup	
 大英雄樂團 WIR SIND HELDEN
 魔幻電音 KOMPUTER	
 鋼索樂團 Wire
 崆樂團 Korn	
 恬野雛菊樂團 WIRE DAISIES
 電力站樂團 Kraftwerk	
 羅伯維特，阿茲蒙與史提芬 Wyatt, Atzmon & Stephen
 黑色風暴樂團 KRYPTERIA	
 楊提爾森 Yann Tiersen
 KT Tunstall	* 雅族合唱團 Yazoo
 拉比席佛瑞 Labi Siffre	
 肯定樂團 Yeasayer
 淑女與鳥 Lady & Bird	
 黃色卡片 Yellowcard
 懷舊女郎 Lady Antebellum	
 老大來了 Yo Majesty
 菈妃 Lafee	
 小野洋子 Yoko Ono
 慵懶樂團 Laid Back	
 小野洋子 YOKO ONO
 蘿拉曼寧 Laura Marling	
 活力小子 You Me At Six
 蘿拉 蜜雪兒 凱莉 LAURA MICHELLE KELLY	
 伊孚杜得 Yves Duteil
 雷斯魔之洛力 Lauri	
 Zaho
 液晶大喇叭 LCD Soundsystem	
 絕對零度樂團 Zero Assoluto
 琳恩瑪蓮 Lene Marlin	
 佐伊 Zoe

See also
 List of record labels

References

External links
 Gold Typhoon official website

Chinese record labels
Record labels established in 2004
Hong Kong record labels
IFPI members
Labels distributed by Warner Music Group
Rock record labels
Taiwanese record labels